Marcel Otte (born 5 October 1948) is a professor of Prehistory at the Université de Liège, Belgium. He is a specialist in Religion, Arts, Sociobiology, and the Upper Palaeolithic times of Europe and Central Asia. In the book Speaking Australopithecus (written together with the philologist Francesco Benozzo) he argues from the archaeological point of view Benozzo's hypothesis that human language appeared with Australopithecus, between 4 and 3 million years ago.

Otte is one of the only advocates of the Paleolithic continuity theory, which states that Indo-European languages originated in Europe and have existed there since Paleolithic times. He first advocated that theory in work published in 1995.

Written works
He has published a number of works, including:
 Étude Archéologique et Historique sur le Château Médièval de Saive Centre belge d'histoire rurale Liege 1973
 Les Pointes à Retouches Plates du Paléolithique Supérieur Initial de Belgique Centre Interdisciplinaire de Recherches Archéologiques Liege 1974
 La préhistoire à Travers les Collections du Musée Curtius de Liège Wahle Liege 1978 
 Le Paléolithique Supérieur Ancien en Belgique Musées Royaux d'art et d'histoire Brussels 1979
 Le Gravettien en Europe Centrale De Tempel Brugge 1981
 Sondages à Marche-les-Dames : Grotte de la Princesse, 1976 with J.M. Degbomont, University of Liege 1981
 Les Fouilles de la place Saint-Lambert à Liège Le Centre Liège 1983
 Préhistoire des Religions Masson Paris 1993 2-225-84068-7
 Le Paléolithique Inférieur et Moyen en Europe A Colin Paris 1996 
 La Grotte du Bois Laiterie : Recolonisation Magdalénienne de la Belgique with Lawrence Straus, University of Liege 1997
 La Préhistoire with Denis Vialou and Patrick Plumet De Boeck Université, Paris 1999 
 Approches du Comportement au Mousterien, British Archaeological Reports Oxford 2000 
 Les Origines de la Pensée Sprimont Mardaga 2001 
 La Protohistoire with Mireille David-Elbiali, Christiane Eluère and Jean-Pierre Mohen De Boeck Université Brussels 2002 
 Recherches sur le Paléolithique Supérieur J and E Hedges Oxford 2003

See also 
 Paleolithic continuity theory

References

External links 
 "Marcel Otte, Préhistorien, Paléoanthropologue", personal site 
 Works at ResearchGate  (registration needed)
 Works at Paleolithic Continuity Paradigm website 

1948 births
Living people
Walloon people
Prehistorians
Belgian archaeologists